Greg Griffin (born September 6, 1952 in Cleveland, Ohio) is a retired professional basketball small forward who spent one season in the National Basketball Association (NBA) as a member of the Phoenix Suns during the 1977–78 season. The Suns drafted Griffin from Idaho State University during the fourth round (71 pick overall) of the 1977 NBA Draft.

External links

1952 births
Living people
American men's basketball players
Basketball players from Cleveland
Idaho State Bengals men's basketball players
Pasadena City Lancers men's basketball players
Phoenix Suns draft picks
Phoenix Suns players
Small forwards